Dekýš (1920–1927: Ďekýš; , until 1913 ) is a village and municipality in Banská Štiavnica District, in the Banská Bystrica Region of Slovakia.

History
Settlements from the Paleolithic period and from the Roman period have been excavated here.

In historical records, the village was first mentioned in 1270 (1270 Gukes, 1388 Gykys). In 1388 it belonged to Levice town and later on to the Mining Chamber. In 1944 men of age from 16 to 40 years were deported to Germany.

Genealogical resources

The records for genealogical research are available at the state archive "Statny Archiv in Banska Bystrica, Slovakia"

 Roman Catholic church records (births/marriages/deaths): 1743-1896 (parish B)
 Lutheran church records (births/marriages/deaths): 1829-1952 (parish B)

See also
 List of municipalities and towns in Slovakia

References

External links
http://www.e-obce.sk/obec/dekys/dekys.html
Surnames of living people in Dekys

Villages and municipalities in Banská Štiavnica District